Lancelot Ernest Moir (18 June 1886 – 29 July 1962) was a New Zealand rugby league player who represented New Zealand in 1912. No test matches were played on that year's tour of Australia.
In 2008 he was named in the Taranaki Rugby League Team of the Century.

References

1886 births
1962 deaths
New Zealand rugby league players
New Zealand national rugby league team players
Taranaki rugby league team players
Rugby league centres
Place of birth missing
People from Auckland